Carole Ashby (born 24 March 1955 in Cannock, Staffordshire) is an English actress and pinup girl. She appeared as a glamour girl in the British news media during the 1970s.

Career
In 1972, Ashby was named "Britain's most glamorous schoolgirl." Ashby is best known for playing the small recurring part of Louise, a member of the communist resistance, in 'Allo 'Allo!.

She appeared alongside Roger Moore in two James Bond films, Octopussy and A View to a Kill. Her appearances were brief but they assured her Bond Girl status.

She appeared in the 1981 hit movie Chariots of Fire. She was a hostess on the final (1983) season of Anglia Television's Sale of the Century.

Personal life
Ashby was at one point engaged to Jeremy Lloyd,  co-creator of 'Allo 'Allo, but they broke up in 1990.

Filmography
Octopussy (1983) – Octopussy Girl.
Arthur the King (1985) - Princess.
Bergerac Series 4, episode 2 (1985) - Moira Montalban
A View to a Kill (1985) – Whistling Girl.
'Allo 'Allo! (1988-1992), Louise
Minder Series 7, episode 5 (1989) 'Fiddler on the Hoof' - ImogenSavage Hearts (1995) – Receptionist #2Cash in Hand'' (1998) – Veronica Tate (Last appearance)

References

External links

Carole Ashby at the British Film Institute

1955 births
Living people
People from Cannock
English television actresses
20th-century English actresses